Cheswick Buildings is a small village in Northumberland, in England.

Governance 
Cheswick Buildings is in the parliamentary constituency of Berwick-upon-Tweed.

References

Villages in Northumberland